CTN may refer to:

Television
bTV Action, a Bulgarian channel (formerly known as CTN)
Cambodian Television Network, Cambodia
Channel 31 (Sydney), which used the callsign CTN-31
Christian Television Network, a Christian broadcast television network in the United States
Chung T'ien Television, a television network based in Taiwan (formerly Chinese Television Network)
Connecticut Network, or CT-N (often misidentified as CTN)
MTVU, United States (formerly College Television Network)

Transport
Charlton railway station (National Rail station code CTN), London, England
Compagnie Tunisienne de Navigation, a Tunisian ferry operator
Cooktown Airport (IATA: CTN)
Croatia Airlines (ICAO: CTN)

Other uses
CTN (retail), Confectionery, Tobacco, and News retailers
CTN Animation Expo, Creative Talent Network Animation Expo in Burbank, California
ctn, a notation for cotangent trigonometric function
Camp Tel Noar, a USA summer camp
Cardiac troponin, see troponin test
Central de Trabajadores Nicaragüenses, the Nicaraguan Workers' Centre
Cryptologic Technician, a U.S. Navy specialist rating